The name Sepat has been used to name four tropical cyclones in the northwestern Pacific Ocean. The name was contributed by Malaysia and refers to a freshwater fish.
 Tropical Storm Sepat (2001) (T0113, 17W) – Never affected land.
 Typhoon Sepat (2007) (T0708, 09W, Egay) – Caused 43 deaths and around $700 million in damage, mostly in China.
 Tropical Storm Sepat (2013) (T1322, 21W)
 Tropical Storm Sepat (2019) (T1903, Dodong) – was not recognised by the JTWC.

Pacific typhoon set index articles